Brandi Shearer (born June 5, 1980) is an American singer-songwriter. She was born and raised in Oregon.

Early life
Brandi Shearer was raised on a farm in rural Oregon where she was encouraged by her grandmother to sing and play music. She was gifted a guitar by her father. In her teens, Shearer studied classical guitar and voice. As a teen, she also won an opera scholarship to attend a local college. Shearer traveled to Hungary as part of a student exchange program. In Hungary, she was exposed to the music of a variety of American Jazz and Blues artists, including Billie Holiday. She subsequently dropped out of college and began performing in clubs and bars in Hungary and France.

Career
In 1998, Shearer moved to San Francisco and released her debut album, which featured contributions from jazz guitarist Ted Savarese. She also played rhythm guitar in Savarese's jazz-oriented ensemble Drizzoletto. During that period she split her time traveling between San Francisco, France, and Hungary, earning her living performing. Shearer released two albums in 2003 and 2004: Music of a Saturday Night and Sycamore. Following their release, Amoeba Records owner David Prinz booked Shearer for a live recording with the gypsy jazz group Robin Nolan Trio in 2005. Various tours and performances followed, including an appearance with Nolan at Austin's SXSW festival. In 2005, Shearer released Rendezvous at the Nightery, her debut recording for Amoeba Records, backed by the Robin Nolan trio, with David Grisman on mandolin, followed by the release of Close to Dark in 2007. After the label folded in 2008, Shearer formed Vinyl Tiger Music, and began recording an album. Love Don't Make You Juliet was released in 2009 and was with producer Craig Street, who had also worked with Norah Jones.

She is in the final stages of completing a record with musicians Me'shell N'degeocello, Autolux drummer Carla Azar, and producer Chris Bruce. Shearer will release the record under the band name 'Hexer' in late spring 2011 or later.

Her music has been used for film and television, including the television series' Dexter, Weeds, True Blood, Prime Suspect and several others.

Discography

Studio albums
 Museum (1999)
 Music of a Saturday Night (2003)
 Sycamore (2004)
 Rendezvous at the Nightery (2005)
 Close to Dark (2007)
 Love Don't Make You Juliet (2009)

Personal life
She is currently living in Los Angeles, California, United States.

References

External links
 

American women singer-songwriters
Singer-songwriters from Oregon
Living people
1980 births
21st-century American singers
21st-century American women singers